This article contains information about the literary events and publications of 1612.

Events
January 6 – Ben Jonson's masque Love Restored is performed.
January 12 – The King's Men and Queen Anne's Men unite for the first of two English Court performances in January, with Thomas Heywood's The Silver Age
January 13 – The King's Men perform Heywood's The Rape of Lucrece.
February 2 – Queen Anne's Men return to court to play Greene's Tu Quoque.
May 11 – Shakespeare testifies in the Bellott v. Mountjoy lawsuit.
November 6 – Henry Frederick, Prince of Wales, eldest son and heir to King James I of England, dies of typhoid fever. His coterie of followers, which included literary figures like Ben Jonson and John Selden, are forced to seek other patrons.
unknown dates
Thomas Shelton publishes The History of the Valorous and Wittie Knight-Errant Don-Quixote of the Mancha, the first translation of Cervantes' novel Don Quixote (first part) into English (or any other language).
The Accademia della Crusca publishes the first dictionary of the Italian language.
"Printers Bible": Some copies of the King James Version of the Bible printed in England this year contain an erratum with Psalm 119:161 reading "printers" (rather than "princes") "have persecuted me without a cause."

New books
Traiano Boccalini – Ragguagli di Parnasso
John Brinsley – ; or The Grammar Schoole
John Davies – Discoverie of the True Causes why Ireland was never entirely subdued
John Davies of Hereford – The Picture of a Happy Man
Edward Grimeston
 The Generall Historie of Spaine (translated from French)
 The General History of the Magnificent State of Venice
Thomas Heywood – An Apology for Actors
Antonius Magirus – Koock-boeck ofte Familieren kevken-boeck
William Strachey - The Historie of Travaile Into Virginia Britannia
Francisco de Quevedo – La cuna y la sepultura

New drama
George Chapman – The Widow's Tears published
Robert Daborne – A Christian Turn'd Turk published
Nathan Field – A Woman is a Weathercock published
Ben Jonson – Love Restored (masque)
John Webster – The White Devil published

Poetry

 Michael Drayton – Poly-Olbion
Luis de Góngora – Fábula de Polifemo y Galatea (Fable of Polyphemus and Galatea)
Expanded edition of The Passionate Pilgrim
George Wither – Elegy on the death of Henry Frederick, Prince of Wales

Births
February 6 – Antoine Arnauld, French theologian and philosopher (died 1694)
February 7 – Thomas Killigrew, English dramatist (died 1683)
February 8 – Samuel Butler, English poet and satirist (died 1680)
February 28 – John Pearson, English theologian and scholar (died 1686)
March 4 (bapt.) – Jan Vos, Dutch poet and dramatist (died 1667)
March 20 – Anne Bradstreet, née Dudley, English-born American poet (died 1672)
unknown date – Edward King, English poet (died 1637)
probable – John Rushworth, English lawyer and historian (died 1690)

Deaths
February – John Gerard (John Gerarde), English botanist and author of herbal (born c. 1545)
March 16 – Thomas Holland, English theologian and Bible translator (born 1539)
April 11 – Emanuel van Meteren, Flemish historian (born 1535)
June 1 – Carlos Félix, 6-year-old son of Lope de Vega.
July 29 – Jacques Bongars, French diplomat and scholar (born 1554)
August 4 – Hugh Broughton, English Biblical scholar (born 1549)
September – Giovanni de' Bardi, Italian music theorist and critic (born 1534)
September 24 – Johannes Lippius, German theologian, philosopher, composer, and music theorist (born 1585)
September 27 – Piotr Skarga (Piotr Poweski), Polish hagiographer (born 1536)
October 7 – Giovanni Battista Guarini, Italian poet (born 1538)
November 20 – Sir John Harington, English courtier, writer and inventor of flush toilet (born 1560)

References

 
Years of the 17th century in literature